The 1985 Nahanni earthquakes is the name for a continuous sequence of earthquakes that began in 1985 in the Nahanni region of the Northwest Territories, Canada. The largest of these earthquakes occurred on December 23, reaching 6.9 on the moment magnitude scale. This is one of the most significant earthquakes in Canada during the 20th century. The earthquakes had a long succession of aftershocks and jolts. The earthquakes amazed both the general public and the earth science community and have been felt in the Yukon, Alberta, Saskatchewan, British Columbia, and southeastern Alaska.

See also
List of earthquakes in 1985
List of earthquakes in Canada

References

Sources

External links

1985 in Canada
1865
1985 earthquakes
Natural history of Alaska
Natural history of Yukon
Natural history of Alberta
Natural history of Saskatchewan
Natural history of British Columbia
December 1985 events in Canada
1985 in the Northwest Territories
Earthquake clusters, swarms, and sequences
1985 disasters in Canada
1985 natural disasters in the United States